Michelle Amos is an electronics design engineer at NASA's John F. Kennedy Space Center. Amos joined NASA in 1990 as an electronics design engineer. She currently designs electrical systems and control equipment in KSC's Advanced Technology Development Center and works on a support team for the International Space Station configuring and documenting its electrical configurations. She is the project manager lead for the shuttle transition and retirement activities.

In 2002 she won an All Star Award at NASA's Women of Color Government and Defense Technology Awards Conference. She was the chairperson of NASA's Black Employee Strategy Team. She worked on Perseverance, the Mars 2020 rover, as a system engineer.

Education 
Amos graduated from Southern University A&M College in 1989 with a Bachelor of Science in electrical engineering. In 2005, she earned a Master of Science in engineering management from the University of Central Florida.

Honors 
In 2002 she won an All Star Award at NASA's Women of Color Government and Defense Technology Awards Conference. She was the chairperson of NASA's Black Employee Strategy Team. In 2003, she received the KSC Strategic Leadership Award

Personal life
Amos was born in Baton Rouge, Louisiana, to Dunk and Dorothy Wright, one of ten children. Amos is a member of the Church of Jesus Christ of Latter-day Saints (LDS Church). She and her husband, John D. Amos, have  three children and live in Oviedo, Florida. In 2020, Amos and her husband began a three-year term leading the Louisiana Baton Rouge Mission of the LDS Church.

References

American electrical engineers
NASA people
African-American Latter Day Saints
African-American scientists
Year of birth missing (living people)
Living people
Latter Day Saints from Florida
Southern University alumni
University of Central Florida alumni
21st-century American engineers
American women engineers
21st-century American women
21st-century African-American women
21st-century African-American people